Roman Olegovich Sidorov (28 March 1955 – 10 February 2015) was a Soviet-born Russian association football forward.

References

External links
 
 Профиль football.odessa.ua 
 Случайный Кадр: футбол под присмотром вождя. (на фото — справа) 

1955 births
2015 deaths
Russian footballers
Soviet footballers
SKA Odesa players
PFC Krylia Sovetov Samara players
FC Dynamo Stavropol players
Sportspeople from Stavropol
Association football forwards
Neftçi PFK players
FC Mashuk-KMV Pyatigorsk players